Anna Björk Kristjánsdóttir (born 14 October 1989) is an Icelandic football defender who plays for Inter Milan in the Italian Serie A (women's football).

Honours 
Stjarnan
Winner
 Úrvalsdeild (3): 2011, 2013, 2014
 Icelandic Women's Cup (3): 2012, 2014, 2015
 Icelandic League Cup A (3): 2013, 2014, 2015
 Icelandic Super Cup (2): 2012, 2015

Runner-up
 Úrvalsdeild: 2015
 Icelandic Super Cup (2): 2013, 2014

References

External links 
 
 KIF Örebro player profile
 

1989 births
Living people
Anna Bjork Kristjansdottir
KIF Örebro DFF players
Damallsvenskan players
Women's association football defenders
Expatriate women's footballers in Sweden
Anna Bjork Kristjansdottir
Anna Bjork Kristjansdottir
IF Limhamn Bunkeflo players
Expatriate women's footballers in the Netherlands
PSV (women) players
Eredivisie (women) players
Iceland women's international footballers
UEFA Women's Euro 2017 players